Ignacio García Camacho (born 4 August 1968) is a Spanish former professional racing cyclist. He rode in one edition of the Tour de France, two editions of the Giro d'Italia and four editions of the Vuelta a España.

Major results

1991
1st Stage 2 Vuelta a los Valles Mineros
5th Overall Vuelta a Aragón
1993
1st  Road race, National Road Championships
1994
4th Subida al Naranco
1995
8th Clasica de Sabiñánigo
1996
2nd Overall Vuelta a Mallorca
1997
2nd Overall Vuelta a Murcia
1st Stage 2

References

External links

1968 births
Living people
Spanish male cyclists
Cyclists from the Region of Murcia